Denis Cotter (1862 – 18 November 1905) was an Australian cricketer. He played three first-class cricket matches for Victoria between 1887 and 1889.

See also
 List of Victoria first-class cricketers

References

External links
 

1862 births
1905 deaths
Australian cricketers
Victoria cricketers
Cricketers from Melbourne